Archford Gutu (born August 5, 1993) is a Zimbabwean International footballer who plays as a midfielder. Gutu has played for both Zimbabwe (Harare) giants Dynamos FC and Caps United in Zimbabwe and won Championships with both teams, 2011 with Dynamos FC and 2016 with Caps United. He has played most of his senior football career in Europe, and represented Zimbabwe National Team.

Club career

Early career 
Gutu joined South Africa's Ajax Cape Town in 2009 on a three-year deal, but failed to make a single appearance in the Premier Soccer League due to registration rules, as he was a minor. On 14 September 2010, he agreed to terminate his contract with Ajax and he returned to Zimbabwe to join The biggest club in the country Dynamos F.C and revived his football career .

Dynamos Harare 
On 25 September 2010, Gutu signed a two-year deal with Dynamos Harare. He made his first appearance for Dynamos on 4 November, coming on as a substitute in a 1–0 win against Monomotapa United. Gutu scored his 1st Dynamos goal in 2010 Derby match against rivals Caps United in a BancABC super8 Cup Final win and he got a man of the match award.. On 28 February 2011, he scored two goals in Dynamos' 3–2 victory over CAPS United in the Bob 87 Super Cup Final. Dynamos went on to win double The 2011 League Championship and The Mbada Diamonds Cup. During his stay at Dynamos FC, Gutu was one of the clubs top players before moving to Sweden.

Kalmar FF
On 20 September 2011, Swedish club Kalmar FF confirmed that they had reached a deal with Dynamos Harare regarding Gutu, as of 1 January 2012 he would go on a six-month loan to Kalmar, together with Pape Diouf from Dakar UC, Senegal. On 14 March 2012, Kalmar FF announced that they had decided to purchase both Gutu and Diouf before Allsvenskan had started, on a four-year deal Gutu is the first Zimbabwean Professional football player to play in Sweden.

International career 
He was capped by Zimbabwe at the under-17, under-20 under-23 levels and the Zimbabwe senior National team. He has won The Cosafa Cups with the Zimbabwe under 20s team in South africa 2007 and went on to captain Zimbabwe under 17 team which won the Cosafa Cup in Namibia the same year, as well as winning The Cosafa Cup with Zimbabwe senior National team as hosts in 2009. In 2011 Gutu was part of the Zimbabwe CHAN team in Sudan , he scored in the second game of group stages to help Zimbabwe beat Ghana by one goal to nil . Archford Gutu is currently the youngest Zimbabwe National Team player to ever make their debut at the age of 16 years 175 days old.

International goals

References

External links 
 
 
 Eliteprospects profile
 
 Archford Gutu at Footballdatabase

1993 births
Living people
Sportspeople from Harare
Zimbabwean footballers
Zimbabwean expatriate footballers
Zimbabwe international footballers
Zimbabwe under-20 international footballers
Zimbabwe youth international footballers
Association football midfielders
Dynamos F.C. players
Kalmar FF players
Cape Town Spurs F.C. players
IFK Värnamo players
Allsvenskan players
Superettan players
Zimbabwean expatriate sportspeople in Sweden
Zimbabwean expatriate sportspeople in South Africa
Expatriate footballers in Sweden
Expatriate soccer players in South Africa
2011 African Nations Championship players
Zimbabwe A' international footballers